Labe may refer to:

 Labe (hamlet), a hamlet in Šumperk District, Czech republic 
 Labé Region, north-central Guinea
 Labé Prefecture
 Labé, the capital of Labé Prefecture
 Louise Labé (c. 1520–1566), French poet
 Elbe, a river in Central Europe (Labe in Czech)
 Labe from albanian region-ethnicity Labëria

See also
 Molon labe (disambiguation)